Periploca mimula is a moth in the family Cosmopterigidae. It was described by Ronald W. Hodges in 1962. It is found in North America, where it has been recorded from Arizona, Tennessee, Arkansas, Washington, Texas, and New Mexico.

Adults have been recorded on wing in July.

The larvae feed on the berries of Juniperus chinensis var. keteleeri.

References

Moths described in 1962
Chrysopeleiinae
Taxa named by Ronald W. Hodges
Moths of North America